Igor Stanojević (born 24 October 1991) is a Serbian football midfielder, who currently plays for Ararat in the Armenian Premier League.

Career

Club
On 15 June 2018, Stanojević signed for FC Banants.

On 17 July 2022, Ararat Yerevan announced the departure of Stanojević by mutual agreement.

References

External links
 
 Igor Stanojević stats at utakmica.rs 
 
 
 

1991 births
Living people
Footballers from Belgrade
Association football midfielders
Serbian footballers
OFK Beograd players
FK BSK Borča players
FK Metalac Gornji Milanovac players
FK Zemun players
FK Pelister players
FC Shirak players
FC Urartu players
FK Mačva Šabac players
FC Ararat Yerevan players
Serbian First League players
Serbian SuperLiga players
Armenian Premier League players
Serbian expatriate footballers
Serbian expatriate sportspeople in Iceland
Serbian expatriate sportspeople in North Macedonia
Serbian expatriate sportspeople in Armenia
Expatriate footballers in Iceland
Expatriate footballers in North Macedonia
Expatriate footballers in Armenia